Gabriel Oche Amanyi  (born 17 March 1986), popularly known by his stage name Terry G, is a Nigerian rapper, singer, songwriter and record executive. He is widely known for his eccentric dress-sense, controversial lyrics and awkward identity. He has been described by The Punch as "one of the world's weirdest singers", by Vanguard as a "weird singer", and by Channels TV as the "craziest musician in Nigeria". In 2013, he released his fourth album, titled Book of Ginjah.

Personal life
Gabriel Oche Amanyi, popularly known as Terry G, was born on March 17, 1986, in Benue State. He shared the same birthday with his mother. He started singing in the choir of his local church.

Career 
The "Akpako Master", as he is fondly called, received critical acclaim for his unique brand of music and personality.

Through his songs, he has admitted to using drugs and alcohol. In September 2014, he told Jane Augoye of The Punch that he has stopped taking hard drugs.

He has cited 2face Idibia as his greatest musical mentor.

Discography

Albums
Free Me
Ginjah Ur Swaggah (Season 1)
Terry G.zuz
Book of Ginjah

Singles
"So High"
"Run Mad"
"Testing Microphone"
"Free Madness"
"Love Affair"
"Sexy Lady"
"Oga"
"Ora"
"Baby Don't Go"
"Furret"
"Omo Dada"
"Adura"

Collaborations 

 Timaya - Malonogede feat. Terry G
 Terry G ft. 9ice - Ori Mi
 Terry G feat. Wizkid, Phyno, Runtown - Knack Am
 Terry G feat. Skiibii - Adura
 YungBilo(Martins Osodi) - Money Matter feats Terry G
 Jaywon feat. Terry G - Gbon Gbon
 Terry G - Brukutu feat. Awilo & Timaya

Videography

References

1986 births
Musicians from Benue State
Nigerian singer-songwriters
Living people
21st-century Nigerian singers